Ocnaea is a genus of small-headed flies (insects in the family Acroceridae). There are 20 described species in Ocnaea.

Species

 Ocnaea auripilosa Johnson, 1923
 Ocnaea boharti Schlinger, 1983
 Ocnaea cisnerosi James, 1950
 Ocnaea coerulea Cole, 1919
 Ocnaea falcifer Aldrich, 1928
 Ocnaea flavipes Aldrich, 1926
 Ocnaea gigas Aldrich, 1928
 Ocnaea gloriosa (Sabrosky, 1943)
 Ocnaea helluo Osten Sacken, 1877
 Ocnaea loewi Cole, 1919
 Ocnaea lugubris Gerstaecker, 1856
 Ocnaea magna (Walker, 1849)
 Ocnaea metallica (Osten Sacken, 1887)
 Ocnaea micans Erichson, 1840
 Ocnaea schwarzi Cole, 1919
 Ocnaea sequoia Sabrosky, 1948
 Ocnaea smithi Sabrosky, 1948
 Ocnaea trichocera Osten Sacken, 1887
 Ocnaea trivittata Aldrich, 1932
 Ocnaea xuthogaster Schlinger, 1961

References

Acroceridae
Nemestrinoidea genera
Diptera of South America
Diptera of North America
Taxa named by Wilhelm Ferdinand Erichson